Teresa Rodriguez (born January 31, 1969) is an American travel writer who wrote Fly Solo: The 50 Best Places on Earth for a Girl to Travel Alone and founded a social network for women travelers.

Teresa's father is from Mexico and her mother is American. Teresa is the oldest of three children. Her younger sister suffered from babyhood from herpes encephalitis, using a wheelchair, and then dying at 11. After this, Teresa vowed to live a full life for her sister's memory.

In 1988, Teresa was working for Richard Simmons, when she met her first husband who was Australian. She immigrated to Australia in 1988.

During her five years in Australia, Teresa worked as a model as well as on a reality TV show Blind Date. She spent her weekends producing recap segments for the show and interviewing people on-location. Teresa returned to the United States in 1993 and moved back to San Francisco.

In 2004 Teresa founded TangoDiva, a social networking site for women travelers. In 2007 Penguin Books published her book Fly Solo. She has remarried and her work has been featured in newspapers and magazines around the world.

References

Living people
1969 births
American travel writers
American women travel writers
Hispanic and Latino American writers
American people of Mexican descent
HuffPost writers and columnists
21st-century American women